Iridium(IV) oxide, IrO2, is the only well-characterised oxide of iridium. It is a blue-black solid. The compound adopts the TiO2 rutile structure, featuring six coordinate iridium and three coordinate oxygen.

It is used with other rare oxides in the coating of anode-electrodes for industrial electrolysis and in microelectrodes for electrophysiology research.

As described by its discoverers, it can be formed by treating the green form of iridium trichloride with oxygen at high temperatures:
2 IrCl3  +  2 O2   →   2 IrO2  +  3 Cl2

A hydrated form is also known.

Application
Iridium dioxide can be used as an anode electrode for industrial electrolysis and as a microelectrode for electrophysiological studies.

Iridium dioxide can be used to make coated electrodes.

References

Iridium compounds
Transition metal oxides